Giovanna Leone (born 3 May 1956) is a former Italian female middle-distance runner and cross-country runner who competed at individual senior level at the World Athletics Cross Country Championships (1974).

Biography
Leone won a silver medal with the national team at the 1974 IAAF World Cross Country Championships.

See also
 List of Italian records in masters athletics

References

External links
 

1956 births
Living people
Italian female middle-distance runners
Italian female cross country runners
Sportspeople from Palermo